A park system, also known as an open space system, is a network of green spaces that are connected by public walkways, bridleways or cycleways. The concept first emerged with the need to minimize fragmentation of natural environments and was referred to as "patch and corridor." In modern landscape architecture, the park system is collaborating with the idea of planning greenways, which run through urban and rural areas. These systems can serve the landscape through ecological, recreational, social, cultural, and healthful measures, and are designed with intentions of sustainability.

One of the earliest park systems, in London, came into existence by chance. As London expanded around former royal parks in the nineteenth century, St. James's Park, Green Park and Hyde Park became part of the urban area. This arrangement was admired in France and adopted for the nineteenth century re-planning of Paris by Baron Haussmann. It was also admired by Frederick Law Olmsted and used to create the famous Emerald Necklace in Boston. Another example is Ebenezer Howard's Adirondack Park concept. These green networks were part of the nineteenth century Garden City Movement.

In 1927, the Maryland-National Capital Park and Planning Commission was formed to plan and acquire parklands along stream valley corridors in the then-rural northern and eastern suburbs of Washington, D.C.  Over 33,000 acres (130 km2) are now protected in the Montgomery County, Maryland portion and provide welcome green space in this urbanized region.  A major proposal for a park system was included in Patrick Abercrombie's 1943-4 County of London Plan.

See also
Greenway (landscape)
Landscape architecture
Landscape planning
National Park Service#National Park System of the United States
Principles of intelligent urbanism

References 

Urban planning
Parks